In the United States and Canada, a jock is a stereotype of an athlete, or someone who is primarily interested in sports and sports culture, and does not take much interest in intellectual activity. It is generally applied mostly to high school and college athletics participants who form a distinct youth subculture. As a blanket term, jock can be considered synonymous with athlete. Jocks are usually presented as male practitioners of team sports such as American football, basketball, baseball, lacrosse, soccer, swimming and ice hockey.

Similar words that may mean the same as jock in North America include meathead, musclebrain, and musclehead. These terms are based on the stereotype that a jock is muscular but not very smart, and cannot carry a conversation on any topic other than one relating to sports and exercise.

"Jocks" is also a slang term used by some English and Welsh people to refer to Scots in general, or to Scottish men.

Origin 

The use of the term "jock" to refer to an athletic man is thought to have emerged around 1963. It is believed to be derived from the word "jockstrap," which is an undergarment worn to support/protect the male genitals while playing sports. In the 1960s, someone who liked sports was sometimes jokingly called an "athletic supporter", which is the actual name for a jockstrap.

Jocks are often contrasted with another stereotype: nerds. This dichotomy is a theme in many American movies, television shows, and books.

In parts of the United Kingdom other than Scotland, the term "jock" is a stereotypical term (possibly, but not necessarily, derogatory) for a Scottish person or, perhaps more commonly, a Scotsman.

Stereotypes 

Various characteristics of the jock stereotype include:

 Aggressive, arrogant, mean, dumb, egotistical, easily offended and ill-tempered
 Muscular, tall and athletic
 Rude
 Does not cry or otherwise show weakness or fear
 Afraid to hug or hold a friend too long, performative masculinity
 Often engages in bullying of those who lack athletic ability, or in bullying anyone to gain power
 Frequently given privileges, such as undeserved passing grades or excused from school discipline, to maintain eligibility for sports.

Portrayal in the media 

Jocks are often present in books, movies, and television shows involving high school and college. The stereotype is most prevalent in movies for teenagers such as College, American Pie, and the Revenge of the Nerds movies; and the video game Bully. The stereotype extends beyond the high-school and collegiate age group into media intended for younger audiences. Examples include the high school football quarterback Dash Baxter in the Nickelodeon cartoon Danny Phantom, and Kevin from the Cartoon Network series Ed, Edd n Eddy. Other notable portrayals of the stereotype include the popular athlete and love interest Tommy Ross in Carrie, the spoiled bullying antagonist Luke Ward in the first season of The O.C., and Kim's wealthy and athletic boyfriend Jim in Edward Scissorhands.

Mass media commonly use stereotypical characteristics of athletes to portray a character who is relatively unintelligent and unenlightened, but nonetheless socially and physically well-endowed. Usually, jocks play aggressive sports such as football or basketball. Examples from television shows include Ryan Shay (Parker Young) in the sitcom Suburgatory and Jimmy Armstrong (Dan Cortese) in the sitcom Hot in Cleveland. The main jock character often occupies a high position, such as the quarterback or captain of the football team. In many cases, the jock is shown to come from a wealthy family, driving a fancy, expensive sports car or SUV, and wearing expensive, name-brand clothing. However, this is not always the case. In this regard, there may be significant overlap with the preppie stereotype.

As a protagonist, the jock is often a dynamic character who has an epiphany or develops a new understanding, and changes his values. This change often leads to a cessation of athletics or some other equivalent social sacrifice, and the character is then no longer being considered a jock. Examples in movies include Randall "Pink" Floyd in Dazed and Confused and Andrew Clark in The Breakfast Club. Examples in television shows include Nathan Scott in the teen drama series One Tree Hill, Whitney Fordman in Smallville and Luke Ward in The O.C..

As antagonists, jocks can be stock characters, shown as lacking compassion for the protagonist, and are generally flat and static. Often in high school comedies or dramas where the main characters are not popular, the jock is the chief antagonist and cruel to the main characters. He is disliked by the nerds and other people who are considered unpopular, and usually comes to an unfortunate (and in some cases, violent or fatal) end. Heathers''' "Kurt" and "Ram" roles, the Spider-Man character Flash Thompson, high school football jocks and Connie D'Amico's cronies Scott and Doug in Family Guy, high school football captain Oliver Wilkerson in The Cleveland Show, Jean Grey's first boyfriend Duncan Matthews in X-Men: Evolution, middle school bully and "Crush Ball" quarterback Rodney Glaxer from Lloyd in Space, and Massimo Lenzetti (Justin Chambers) in the film The Wedding Planner are examples. There are also numerous jock antagonists found in teen dramas, such as the rapist Dean Walton in Degrassi.

On the show Pretty Little Liars, Emily Fields is the athletic one of the group. In the 1978 movie Grease, Danny Zuko changed his greaser look for a jock to impress his lover Sandy. The character of Buzz McCallister in the 1990 film Home Alone and its 1992 sequel, Lost in New York, appears to be a jock due to his love for basketball and his being a fan of Michael Jordan and the Chicago Bulls as well as his bullying of the protagonist character, Kevin McCallister. In the 2006, hit movie High School Musical, Troy Bolton was a star jock of East High School in addition to other characters Chad Danforth, Zeke Baylor, and also Troy's father Jack Bolton. In 2013's Monsters University, Johnny Worthington is the proud leader of Roar Omega Roar (RΩR). Additionally, Kevin Thompson of Daria'', which satirized high school life, conformed to the "dumb" athlete stereotype, though was never mean towards lead character Daria Morgendorffer and her friend Jane Lane; another jock character, Mac Mackenzie, was depicted as intelligent and cordial to the main characters, and was never shown to be a bully even though he was often disturbed by Kevin's dimness.

Other Jock characters in media

Academics and athletics
The general perception that athletes are unintelligent is derived from the idea that athletic and academic success are mutually exclusive. Prior to 1990, many researchers were critical with respect to the impact of extracurricular activities and athletics in particular on education. According to the so-called "Zero Sum Model," education and extracurriculars compete for student's time. However, later studies present a strong evidence that athletic or cultural extracurricular activities in school would increase school attendance, self-confidence, grade (in some instance), and college attendance but would reduce performance in standardized test.

Despite the fact that many schools recruit for sports, they put stipulations in place that require student athletes to maintain minimum academic grade in order to maintain their scholarships. Schools recruit students to their athletic teams, but require a student maintain a certain grade-point average (GPA) in order to have the scholarship renewed. For many young athletes, this is imperative as they could not afford higher education on their own. Therefore, they balance enough study to remain eligible with the demands of their sport.

At the college level in the United States, the NCAA does have some education requirements that must be met for high school students to play in a Division I school, and to be eligible for a scholarship. The most recent standards passed by the NCAA, which will apply to all incoming college freshmen beginning with the class of 2016, requires that 16 core high school courses be completed by the student-athlete, 7 of which must be either math, science, or English, and 10 of those 16 classes must be completed prior to their senior year of high school. As well, the students must graduate high school with a minimum 2.3 GPA (up from the 2.0 GPA requirement that was in place prior to these new standards). Such requirements have been debated for years, however.

See also
 Airhead subculture
 Anti-intellectualism
 Anti-jock movement
 Chad (slang)
 Greaser
 Hearties – the equivalent term at Oxford University
 Nerd
 Preppy and its 1950s precursor the Soc subculture
 Tomboy

References

1963 neologisms
Academic slang
Athletic sports
Stereotypes of men
Sports culture
Male stock characters
Student culture